Eois zenobia is a moth in the family Geometridae first described by William Schaus in 1912. It is found in Costa Rica.

References

Moths described in 1912
Eois
Moths of Central America